Jean-Philippe Pougeau is a French rugby league player who represented France national rugby league team.

He later started a restaurant in Saint-Estève.

References

Living people
French rugby league players
France national rugby league team players
Rugby league fullbacks
French restaurateurs
AS Saint Estève players
Year of birth missing (living people)